Ch. Sabine Rarebit was a best in show winner at the Westminster Kennel Club Dog Show in 1910.  He was a Smooth-coated fox terrier considered to be "not only the best fox terrier out, but, in the opinion of many judges, the best ever bred."

References

Best in Show winners of the Westminster Kennel Club Dog Show